Preston Lake is a lake in Renville County, in the U.S. state of Minnesota.

Preston Lake bears the name of a pioneer settler.

See also
List of lakes in Minnesota

References

Lakes of Minnesota
Lakes of Renville County, Minnesota